The Wurango or Wurrugu are an indigenous Australian people of the Northern Territory.

Country
The Wurango's tribal lands encompassed about  around the western end of the Cobourg Peninsula including Port Essington.

People
Crawford Pasco described the Wurango as he found them in 1838 as numerous, and of very good health since many reached the venerable age of 70.

Social organisation
Norman Tindale speculated that mentions of the Tji and Jalo in this area clearly referring to the Wurango probably denoted hordes. If so, then he classified their respective localities as follows:

 Tji, a Wurango horde located at the western end of the Peninsula.
 Ja:loa Wurango horde in Port Essington.

The following clan marriage sections are said to have existed:
 Manderojelli
 Manburlgeat
 Mandrowilli

Alternative names
 Auwulwarwak
 Ja:lo. (ja:lo = 'no')
 (?) Limba-Karadjee. (See Iwaidja)
 Wa:reidbug, Woreidbug
 Warooko
 Wurrunga, Wurrango
 Wuru:ku, U:ru:ku
 Yarlo

Source:

Some words
 naween (father)
 noyoke (mother)

Source:

Notes

Citations

Sources

Aboriginal peoples of the Northern Territory